Sorafenib, sold under the brand name Nexavar, is a kinase inhibitor drug approved for the treatment of primary kidney cancer (advanced renal cell carcinoma), advanced primary liver cancer (hepatocellular carcinoma), FLT3-ITD positive AML and radioactive iodine resistant advanced thyroid carcinoma.

Mechanism of action
Sorafenib is a protein kinase inhibitor with activity against many protein kinases, including VEGFR, PDGFR and RAF kinases. Of the RAF kinases, sorafenib is more selective for c-Raf than B-RAF. (See BRAF (gene)#Sorafenib for details the drug's interaction with B-Raf.)

Sorafenib treatment induces autophagy, which may suppress tumor growth. Based on its 1,3-disubstituted urea structure, sorafenib is also a potent soluble epoxide hydrolase inhibitor and this activity likely reduces the severity of its adverse effects.

Medical uses
Sorafenib is indicated as a treatment for advanced renal cell carcinoma (RCC), unresectable hepatocellular carcinomas (HCC) and thyroid cancer.

Kidney cancer
Clinical trial results, published January 2007, showed that, compared with placebo, treatment with sorafenib prolongs progression-free survival in patients with advanced clear cell renal cell carcinoma in whom previous therapy has failed. The median progression-free survival was 5.5 months in the sorafenib group and 2.8 months in the placebo group (hazard ratio for disease progression in the sorafenib group, 0.44; 95% confidence interval [CI], 0.35 to 0.55; P<0.01).

In Australia this is one of two TGA-labelled indications for sorafenib, although it is not listed on the Pharmaceutical Benefits Scheme for this indication.

Liver cancer
At ASCO 2007, results from the SHARP trial were presented, which showed efficacy of sorafenib in hepatocellular carcinoma. The primary endpoint was median overall survival, which showed a 44% improvement in patients who received sorafenib compared to placebo (hazard ratio 0.69; 95% CI, 0.55 to 0.87; p=0.0001). Both median survival and time to progression showed 3-month improvements; however, there was no significant difference in median time to symptomatic progression (p=0.77). There was no difference in quality of life measures, possibly attributable to toxicity of sorafenib or symptoms related to underlying progression of liver disease. Of note, this trial only included patients with Child-Pugh Class A (i.e. mildest) cirrhosis. Because of this trial sorafenib obtained FDA approval for the treatment of advanced hepatocellular carcinoma in November 2007.

In a randomized, double-blind, phase II trial combining sorafenib with doxorubicin, the median time to progression was not significantly delayed compared with doxorubicin alone in patients with advanced hepatocellular carcinoma. Median durations of overall survival and progression-free survival were significantly longer in patients receiving sorafenib plus doxorubicin than in those receiving doxorubicin alone.

A prospective single-centre phase II study which included the patients with unresectable hepatocellular carcinoma (HCC) concluding that the combination of sorafenib and DEB-TACE in patients with unresectable HCC is well tolerated and safe, with most toxicities related to sorafenib.

In Australia this is the only indication for which sorafenib is listed on the PBS and hence the only government-subsidised indication for sorafenib. Along with renal cell carcinoma, hepatocellular carcinoma is one of the TGA-labelled indications for sorafenib.

Thyroid cancer
On 22 November 2013, sorafenib was approved by the FDA for the treatment of locally recurrent or metastatic, progressive differentiated thyroid carcinoma (DTC) refractory to radioactive iodine treatment.

The phase III DECISION trial showed significant improvement in progression-free survival but not in overall survival. However, as is known, the side effects were very frequent, specially hand and foot skin reaction.

Adverse effects
Adverse effects by frequency
Note: Potentially serious side effects are in bold.
Very common (>10% frequency)

 Lymphopenia
 Hypophosphataemia
 Haemorrhage
 Hypertension
 Diarrhea
 Rash
 Alopecia (hair loss; occurs in roughly 30% of patients receiving sorafenib)
 Hand-foot syndrome
 Pruritus (itchiness)
 Erythema
 Increased amylase
 Increased lipase
 Fatigue
 Pain
 Nausea
 Vomiting

Common (1-10% frequency)
 
 Leucopenia
 Neutropoenia
 Anaemia
 Thrombocytopenia
 Anorexia (weight loss)
 Hypocalcaemia
 Hypokalaemia
 Depression
 Peripheral sensory neuropathy
 Tinnitus
 Congestive heart failure
 Myocardial infarction
 Myocardial ischaemia
 Hoarseness
 Constipation
 Stomatitis
 Dyspepsia
 Dysphagia
 Dry skin
 Exfoliative dermatitis
 Acne
 Skin desquamation
 Arthralgia
 Myalgia
 Kidney failure
 Proteinuria
 Erectile dysfunction
 Asthenia (weakness)
 Fever
 Influenza-like illness

 Transient increase in transaminase

Uncommon (0.1-1% frequency)

 Folliculitis
 Infection
 Hypersensitivity reactions
 Hypothyroidism
 Hyperthyroidism
 Hyponatraemia
 Dehydration
 Reversible posterior leukoencephalopathy
 Hypertensive crisis
 Rhinorrhoea
 Interstitial lung disease-like events
 Gastro-oesophageal reflux disease (GORD)
 Pancreatitis
 Gastritis
 Gastrointestinal perforations
 Increase in bilirubin leading, potentially, to jaundice
 Cholecystitis
 Cholangitis
 Eczema
 Erythema multiforme
 Keratoacanthoma
 Squamous cell carcinoma
 Gynaecomastia (swelling of the breast tissue in men)
 Transient increase in blood alkaline phosphatase
 INR abnormal
 Prothrombin level abnormal
 bulbous skin reaction 

Rare (0.01-0.1% frequency)

 QT interval prolongation
 Angiooedema
 Anaphylactic reaction
 Hepatitis
 Radiation recall dermatitis
 Stevens–Johnson syndrome
 Leucocytoclastic vasculitis
 Toxic epidermal necrolysis
 Nephrotic syndrome
 Rhabdomyolysis

History

Renal cancer
Sorafenib was approved by the U.S. Food and Drug Administration (FDA) in December 2005, and received European Commission marketing authorization in July 2006, both for use in the treatment of advanced renal cancer.

Liver cancer
The European Commission granted marketing authorization to the drug for the treatment of patients with hepatocellular carcinoma(HCC), the most common form of liver cancer, in October 2007, and FDA approval for this indication followed in November 2007.

In November 2009, the UK's National Institute of Clinical Excellence declined to approve the drug for use within the NHS in England, Wales and Northern Ireland, stating that its effectiveness (increasing survival in primary liver cancer by 6 months) did not justify its high price, at up to £3000 per patient per month. In Scotland the drug had already been refused authorization by the Scottish Medicines Consortium for use within NHS Scotland, for the same reason.

In March 2012, the Indian Patent Office granted a domestic company, Natco Pharma, a license to manufacture generic sorafenib, bringing its price down by 97%. Bayer sells a month's supply, 120 tablets, of Nexavar for. The royalty was later raised to 7% on appeal by Bayer. Under the Patents Act, 1970 and the World Trade Organisation TRIPS Agreement, the government can issue a compulsory license when a drug is not available at an affordable price.

Society and culture

Nexavar controversy 

In January 2014, Bayer's CEO Marijn Dekkers allegedly stated that Nexavar was developed for "Western patients who can afford it, not for Indians". However, Dekkers actually never said this. In fact, his words were misquoted and the context was omitted.  A kidney cancer patient would pay $96,000 (£58,000) for a year's course of the Bayer-made drug, whereas the cost of the Indian version of the generic drug would be around $2,800 (£1,700).

Research

Lung
In some kinds of lung cancer (with squamous-cell histology) sorafenib administered in addition to paclitaxel and carboplatin may be detrimental to patients.

Ovarian cancer
Sorafenib has been studied as maintenance therapy after ovarian cancer treatment and in combination with chemotherapy for recurrent ovarian cancer but did not show results that led to approval of the drug for these indications.

Brain (recurrent glioblastoma)
There is a phase I/II study at the Mayo Clinic of sorafenib and CCI-779 (temsirolimus) for recurrent glioblastoma.

Desmoid tumor (aggressive fibromatosis)
A study performed in 2008 showed that Sorafenib is active against aggressive fibromatosis. This study is being used as justification for using sorafenib as an initial course of treatment in some patients with aggressive fibromatosis.

A phase III clinical trial is testing the effectiveness of sorafenib to treat desmoid tumors (also known as aggressive fibromatosis), after positive results in the first two trial stages. Dosage is typically half of that applied for malignant cancers (400 mg vs 800 mg). NCI are sponsoring this trial.

Notes

References

External links
 
 

Bayer brands
Orphan drugs
Receptor tyrosine kinase inhibitors
Chloroarenes
Trifluoromethyl compounds
Anilines
Ureas
Phenol ethers
Pyridines
Carboxamides
Diaryl ethers